{{DISPLAYTITLE:C27H22O18}}
The molecular formula C27H22O18 (molar mass: 634,43 g/mol, exact mass: 634.08062 u) may refer to:

 Corilagin, an ellagitannin
 Punicacortein A, an ellagitannin
 Punicacortein B, an ellagitannin
 Strictinin, an ellagitannin